Bradford School may refer to:

Bradford School (Columbus)
Bradford School (Pittsburgh)

See also
Bradford Grammar School, Bradford, England